Jhonatan Javier Amores Carua (born 29 August 1998) is an Ecuadorian racewalking athlete. He qualified to represent Ecuador at the 2020 Summer Olympics in Tokyo 2021, competing in men's 50 kilometres walk.

References

External links
 

 

1998 births
Living people
Ecuadorian male racewalkers
Athletes (track and field) at the 2020 Summer Olympics
Olympic athletes of Ecuador